The Philadelphia Phillies are a Major League Baseball team.

Phillies may also refer to:

Sports
Reading Fightin Phils, formerly the Reading Phillies, an Eastern League baseball team and AA-level farm team of the Major League club
Clearwater Threshers, formerly the Clearwater Phillies, a Florida State League baseball team and high-A-level farm team of the Major League club
Florida Complex League Phillies, formerly the GCL Phillies, a Gulf Coast League baseball team  and farm team of the Major League club
VSL Phillies, a Venezuelan Summer League baseball team  and farm team of the Major League club
Dominican Summer Phillies, a Dominican Summer League baseball team and farm team of the Major League club
Philadelphia Phillies (NFL), the National Football League (1902) team

Other uses
Phillies cigars, an American brand of cigars

See also

Philly (disambiguation)
Philadelphia (disambiguation)
Philadelphian (disambiguation)